Cătălin Emanuel Mulțescu, (born 26 April 1976 in Petroșani) is a former Romanian football player. He's the son of former international player and coach Gheorghe Mulțescu.

Honours

Club
Astra Ploiești
 Liga II: 1997–98
Jiul Petroșani
 Liga II: 2004–05
Zimbru Chișinău
 Moldovan Cup: 2002–03, 2003–04

References

External links
 
Cătălin Mulţescu - Ceahlăul Piatra Neamț Official Site

1976 births
Living people
People from Petroșani
Romanian footballers
Liga I players
Liga II players
AFC Rocar București players
FC Astra Giurgiu players
CSM Jiul Petroșani players
FC Petrolul Ploiești players
CSM Ceahlăul Piatra Neamț players
FC Zimbru Chișinău players
Association football goalkeepers
Romanian expatriate footballers
Expatriate footballers in Moldova
Romanian expatriate sportspeople in Moldova